Ían Jairo Misael Torres Ramírez (born 5 July 2000) is a Mexican professional footballer who plays as a winger for Major League Soccer club Chicago Fire.

Club career

Youth
Torres joined Atlas youth academy in 2011. Which he then continued through Los Rojinegros Youth Academy successfully going through U-13, U-15, U-17 and U-20. He finally broke thorough to the first team, José Guadalupe Cruz being the coach promoting Torres to the first team.

Senior
On November 19, 2016, Torres made his professional debut for Atlas in the Liga MX against Chiapas subbing in at the 45th minute ending in a 1–0 loss.

On February 19, 2022, Torres signed a contract with Chicago Fire that will run through 2025, effective May 1, 2022.

International career

Youth
On 7 May 2017, Torres won the 2017 CONCACAF U-17 Championship with the under-17 squad. He was named the best player of the tournament.

In May 2019, Torres was called up by Jaime Lozano to participate in that year's Toulon Tournament, where Mexico finished third in the tournament.

Senior
On 2 October 2019, Torres made his senior national team debut in a friendly match against Trinidad & Tobago, coming in as a substitute for Jesús Ricardo Angulo at half-time.

Career statistics

Club

International

Honours
Atlas
Liga MX: Apertura 2021

Mexico U17
CONCACAF U-17 Championship: 2017

Individual
CONCACAF U-17 Championship Golden Ball: 2017
CONCACAF U-17 Championship Best XI: 2017

References

External links

2000 births
Living people
Mexican footballers
Mexico international footballers
Mexico youth international footballers
Mexican expatriate footballers
Mexican expatriate sportspeople in the United States
Association football forwards
Atlas F.C. footballers
Chicago Fire FC players
Designated Players (MLS)
Expatriate soccer players in the United States
Footballers from Jalisco
Liga MX players
People from Guadalajara, Jalisco
Major League Soccer players